The Sikh Gurdwaras Act, 1925 was a piece of legislation in British India which legally defined Sikh identity and brought Sikh gurdwaras (houses of worship) under the control of an elected body of orthodox Sikhs.

Gurdwara reform movement

Prior to 1925, a large proportion of the gurdwaras in India were under the control of clergy of the Udasi denomination of Sikhism. The Udasi differed from their mainline Sikh congregants, and due to differences in theology (such as syncretic Hindu practices) as well as some instances of malfeasance were seen as allowing or committing behaviours unsuitable for a gurdwara. By the 1920s, resentment of this perceived corruption led to the foundation of the Akali Movement which negotiated or forced Udasi mahants (religious heads) out of control of key gurdwaras.

Legislation
Among the issues addressed by the legislation:
 Identification as a Sikh was defined by the attestation: One who professes the Sikh religion - I solemnly affirm that I am a Sikh, that I believe in the Guru Granth Sahib, that I believe in the Ten Gurus, and that I have no other religion. This definition was to stand until 1945.
 Custody of historic Sikh shrines would pass to the Shiromani Gurdwara Parbandhak Committee, a Sikh-led committee.
 The SGPC, formed in 1920, was defined as consisting of 120 practicing Sikhs, the heads of the Panj Takht (five primary Sikh gurdwaras), 12 appointees from the Princely States, and "14 co-opted members".

See also
Delhi Sikh Gurdwaras Act, 1971

References

External links
 text of the Sikh Gurdwara Act, 1925

Law about religion in India
Law about religion in Pakistan
Sikh politics
Church and state law
Gurdwaras
1925 in law
1925 in India
1925 in the United Kingdom
1925 in religion